HMAS Aware (P 91) was an  of the Royal Australian Navy (RAN).

Design and construction

The Attack class was ordered in 1964 to operate in Australian waters as patrol boats (based on lessons learned through using the s on patrols of Borneo during the Indonesia-Malaysia Confrontation, and to replace a variety of old patrol, search-and-rescue, and general-purpose craft. Initially, nine were ordered for the RAN, with another five for Papua New Guinea's Australian-run coastal security force, although another six ships were ordered to bring the class to twenty vessels. Propulsion machinery consisted of two 16-cylinder Paxman YJCM diesel engines, which supplied  to the two propellers. The ship's company consisted of three officers and sixteen sailors. Main armament was a bow-mounted Bofors 40 mm gun, supplemented by two .50-calibre M2 Browning machine guns and various small arms. The ships were designed with as many commercial components as possible: the Attacks were to operate in remote regions of Australia and New Guinea, and a town's hardware store would be more accessible than home base in a mechanical emergency.

Aware was laid down by Evans Deakin and Company at Brisbane in Queensland in July 1967, launched on 7 October 1967 and commissioned on 21 June 1968.

Operational history

Aware was transferred to the Adelaide Port Division of the Royal Australian Navy Reserve in November 1982.

Decommissioning and civilian service
The patrol boat paid off on 17 July 1993. She was sold to a private owner sometime before 1998, and after modification in Melbourne (including an extension of the superstructure to cover the quarterdeck), was used as a diving and salvage ship.

In 2006, Aware was acquired by a group of investors, and sailed to Bundaberg, Queensland by a former crewmember. The investors withdrew support shortly after, and the former crew member took over ownership of the vessel. Aware fell into disrepair, and in 2010, the Bundaberg Magistrates Court fined the owner for failing to have the ship insured. According to the owner, the lack of facilities capable of handing the former patrol boat has made insurance inspections almost impossible. A buyer for the vessel could not be found and in December 2011 the vessel was scrapped.

Citations

References

Attack-class patrol boats
Ships built in Queensland
1967 ships